Segerström is a Swedish surname that may refer to 
Bibbi Segerström (1943–2014), Swedish swimmer
Evald Segerström (1902–1985), Swedish race walker
Henry Segerstrom (1923–2015), American philanthropist, entrepreneur and patron of the arts
Michael Segerström (born 1944), Swedish actor and director
Pontus Segerström (1981–2014), Swedish football player 
Stina Segerström (born 1982), Swedish football defender 

Swedish-language surnames